Louis Courron (9 April 1914 – 21 November 1983) was a French racewalker. He competed in the men's 10 kilometres walk at the 1948 Summer Olympics.

References

1914 births
1983 deaths
Athletes (track and field) at the 1948 Summer Olympics
French male racewalkers
Olympic athletes of France
Place of birth missing